This is a list of The Citadel baseball seasons. The Citadel Bulldogs baseball team represents The Citadel, The Military College of South Carolina and is a member of the Southern Conference of the NCAA Division I. The team played its first season in 1899, but complete records were not kept until after the ACC split prior to the 1954 season. Results listed for seasons prior to that are those compiled by the school from historical accounts and represent the most current information The Citadel has.  No team was fielded from 1932–34 or from 1941–46.  In addition, the 1917 team was disbanded due to the outbreak of World War I.

The Bulldogs are eight time Southern Conference baseball tournament champions, thirteen time regular season conference champions, and have participated in postseason play thirteen times through the 2017 season.  In 1990, the team won the Atlantic Regional in Miami, FL and advanced to the 1990 College World Series, becoming the first and (as of 2016) only military school to ever play in Omaha.

Season Results

Notes

Sources:

References

Citadel
Citadel Bulldogs baseball seasons